Antonio Espejo may refer to:

 Antonio de Espejo (1540–1585), Spanish explorer
 Antonio Espejo (cyclist) (born 1968), Spanish racing cyclist
 Antonio Espejo (killed 1921), Spanish policeman